Robert Harvey Coronado (born May 22, 1936) is a former American football player who played for Pittsburgh Steelers of the National Football League (NFL). He played college football at the University of the Pacific.

References

1936 births
Living people
Pacific Tigers football players
Pittsburgh Steelers players
American football wide receivers
Players of American football from California
Sportspeople from Vallejo, California